The 2013 WNBL Finals was the postseason tournament of the WNBL's 2012–13 season. The Dandenong Rangers were the defending champions but were defeated in the preliminary final by Townsville.

Standings

Bracket

Semi-finals

(1) Bendigo Spirit  vs. (2) Dandenong Rangers

(3) Adelaide Lightning vs. (4) Townsville Fire

Preliminary final

(2) Dandenong Rangers vs. (4) Townsville Fire

Grand Final

(1) Bendigo Spirit vs. (4) Townsville Fire

Rosters

References 

Finals
Women's National Basketball League Finals
2014 Finals